The Batcave is Batman's secret hideout.

Batcave or Bat Cave may also refer to:

 Batcave (club), a Gothic rock nightclub
 Bat Cave, Nepal
 Bat Cave, North Carolina
 Bat Cave and Cascade Caverns State Nature Preserves, a nature preserve in Kentucky dedicated to protecting the endangered Indiana bat
 Bat Cave mine, a cave in Arizona
 Royal Ontario Museum Bat Cave, artificial bat cave in Toronto's Royal Ontario Museum
 Bat Cave, Saint Lucia, a cave in Saint Lucia
 Gowanus Batcave, a former power station in Brooklyn, New York City
 Lepakkoluola (literally "bat cave"), a former youth cultural location in Helsinki, Finland